William of Montferrat is the name of:
 William I of Montferrat (d. before 933)
 William II of Montferrat (died probably around 961)
 William III of Montferrat (991 – bef.1042), son of Otho I
 William IV of Montferrat (c.1084–c.1100)
 William V of Montferrat (c.1136–1191)
 William of Montferrat, Count of Jaffa and Ascalon (c. 1140–1177), also called William Longsword (early 1140s–1177)
 William VI of Montferrat, (1207–1225)
 William of Montferrat (monk), 13th century
 William VII of Montferrat (c.1255–1292), titular king of Thessalonica
 William VIII of Montferrat (1464–1483)
 William IX of Montferrat (1494–1518), see Casale Monferrato
 William X of Montferrat, 1st duke of Montferrat, Duke of Mantua